Octavia Boulevard (designated as Octavia Street north of Hayes Street) is a major street in San Francisco, California, that replaced the Hayes Valley portion of the damaged two-level Central Freeway. Once a portion of Octavia Street alongside shadowy, fenced-off land beneath the elevated U.S. Route 101 roadway, Octavia Boulevard was redeveloped and redesigned upon the suggestion of Mark Jolles of San Francisco.

Due to multiple city ballot measures regarding the damaged Central Freeway and significant controversy, Mayor Willie Brown and the Board of Supervisors appointed a committee assisted by the planning department to come up with a solution.  Replacing the freeway over Market Street was not acceptable because it impeded on the Market Street view corridor.  A replacement tunnel would have to go below a Market Street Muni Rail tunnel, therefore would be too deep, so was not feasible.

At a public meeting, Jolles compared the central freeway traffic volumes to those on 8th and 9th street south of Market.  He noted that Octavia Street, redesigned as a boulevard, could handle the same volumes.  This would make better use of the freeway's right-of-way for additional street space and new housing without the visual impact of an elevated roadway.  Comparable examples cited as boulevards were the configuration of Park Presidio Blvd, Funston Street, and 14th Avenue in the Richmond District, and Sunset Boulevard in the Sunset District, all in San Francisco.

In addition, Jolles recalled growing up in the Washington, DC, area. He was familiar with boulevard designs there including K Street as well as boulevards that substituted for freeways in the Washington suburbs such as Viers Mill Road and Connecticut Avenue.  Paris and the Champs Elysee design and Napoleon's sponsorship of Baron Haussman's grand boulevards imposed on the maze like Paris street system are comparisons too. They reflect Washington's other grand boulevards in the L'enfant plan.  The French influence on the Reforma and boulevards in Mexico City during Maximilian's reign in Mexico are models as well.  All of these examples inspired and suggested a boulevard design for Octavia would work.

This type of road design provides for better overall access to the street grid than a grade separated freeway.  A boulevard separates local traffic from through traffic while still allowing for flexibility during congestion.  This benefits motorists who can easily change their route during backups.  This is ideal for busy urban corridors.  For elevated freeways, due to limited access to local streets, traffic cannot readily adjust when needed.  Also noted during the discussions was that during heavy traffic, travel times on the boulevard would be comparable to those of a backed-up elevated freeway.  This suggests there was no benefit to replacing an urban freeway with one of the same limited access design.

Finally, Jolles lived on Haight Street near the freeway for several years in the 1980s.  He remembers the freeway blocking views of Victorian structures and the loss of natural sunlight.  Blight was caused by the double decker concrete behemoth overwhelming street life with noise, dust, and shadows.  Crime and prostitutes lingering below the structure are also strong memories.  This was his motivation to attend the meetings and suggest a more human scale solution to improving mobility in the area.

There were two other suggestions made during the meeting.  One was to provide a full surface street crosstown boulevard.  This included removing the entire elevated freeway along Division to make that a Boulevard as well.  When a block of public housing was being replaced at Webster a better connection from that divided street to Oak and Fell could be added.  This could have provided an entire surface boulevard from 16th Street all the way to Geary.  Improved development along Division could have followed.  However, just removing the Octavia Blvd section of freeway was controversial, so the entire solution was considered politically unfeasible.

Finally, there was a suggestion to increase capacity, mobility, and access for non-auto trips along Oak and Fell.  This included a future branch of the Market Street F Line west as a couplet along Oak and Fell towards Golden Gate Park.  This would provide an attractive non-auto alternative from downtown for commuters, tourists, recreational, and community access to Alamo Square, Haight Street, the Panhandle, and Golden Gate Park's cultural and recreational resources.

The boulevard is merely four blocks long from Market to Fell Street, containing multiple lanes that separate local and through traffic.  On Octavia, homes and businesses located immediately on the street are served by the quieter outer roadways, while lanes leading to and from the rebuilt Central Freeway spur connect faster traffic with the inner roadways.  Having replaced a freeway, the boulevard distributes traffic smoothly and evenly throughout the immediate neighborhood, while maintaining the links to the major San Francisco traffic arterials that the old elevated freeway used to connect to directly, including Fell and Oak Streets (which serve the city's western neighborhoods) and Franklin and Gough Streets (which serve northern neighborhoods and the Golden Gate Bridge). A brand new park named Hayes Green was created as part of the boulevard project. It lies on Octavia between Fell and Hayes Street.

North of Hayes Street, Octavia continues as Octavia Street through the Western Addition, Pacific Heights and Marina neighborhoods to Bay Street, at Fort Mason.

Other freeway removal projects in the San Francisco Bay, due to seismic stability (or collapse), include the replacement of San Francisco's Embarcadero Freeway, and the reuse of the collapsed Cypress Structure's right-of-way in neighboring Oakland.

Origin of name 
The name refers to Octavia Gough, sister of Charles H. Gough. A contractor who carried out the planking and paving of many San Francisco streets, Charles served on the commission to design the layout of streets in the Western Addition, according to an obituary published in the San Francisco Call on July 27, 1895.

Related places nearby 
Parallel to Octavia and immediately east of it is Gough Street.

Octavia is 8 blocks east of Divisadero, which at the time of its naming was the nearest major north–south thoroughfare. "Octavia" is a name which means, "the eighth".

There is an octagon-shaped building (named The Octagon House at 2645 Gough Street, on the northwest corner of Gough and Green streets. As of 2013, it operates as a historic museum, housing colonial-era folk art and documents.

Today, the Academy of Art University owns and operates a building on the street for housing purposes.

References

External links 
 SFCityscape.com: Octavia Boulevard
 Market & Octavia Neighborhood Plan City & County of San Francisco.
 Congress for the New Urbanism History of Octavia Boulevard
  Points of Interest near Union Street
  Origins of San Francisco Street Names

Streets in San Francisco
Boulevards in the United States
Western Addition, San Francisco